Terrance F. Orr (born September 27, 1961) is a former American football tight end in the National Football League (NFL) for the Washington Redskins and the San Diego Chargers. He played high school football for Cooper High School in Abilene, Texas, and college football at the University of Texas.

In August 2001, Orr was sentenced to fourteen months in prison for defrauding three former Redskins players (including Art Monk) and a Georgia businessman with a failed shoe company.

Personal life
Orr has 3 sons, Zach, Nick, and Chris, all of whom played professional football. Zach is currently the inside linebackers coach for the Baltimore Ravens, Nick is currently a free agent, and Chris currently plays for the New Jersey Generals of the United States Football League (USFL).

References

External links
 

1961 births
Living people
American football tight ends
San Diego Chargers players
Washington Redskins players
Texas Longhorns football players
Players of American football from Savannah, Georgia